A Year in the Death of Jack Richards is a 2004 Canadian psychological drama film featuring Vlasta Vrána as the title character, a professor of theology, who may or may not have made himself the target of a supposed cult, whose members then worship him for a year so that they may kill him as an atonement for their sins. An English-language feature film shot and set in Montreal, it is the debut feature film from Canadian director B. P. Paquette, and also features in supporting roles Micheline Lanctôt, Harry Hill, and Darryl Hunter.

Presented at numerous film festivals in countries from around the world, and honoured with prizes and accolades, A Year in the Death of Jack Richards absolutely polarized critics when it was released in commercial theatres.

A Year in the Death of Jack Richards is the first panel in Paquette's triptych on the psychology of romantic love, followed by The Woman of Ahhs: A Self-Portrait by Victoria Fleming (2008), and The Anonymous Rudy S. (2016).

Production
Paquette has discussed two avenues that led to the development of his story. The first was that of an old European legend, circa 15th century, of religious sects scooping up individuals to be cared for by the group for a year before being killed. The second is closer to Paquette's past. "I came to film school, Concordia University's Mel Hoppenheim School of Cinema, to do my Bachelor's and while I was there I got to know the director of the program. He was this old Polish guy, single, very kind of gruff," Paquette says. "I loved him to death. He was the smartest film guy I ever had and I didn't know a lot of people in Montreal so I took to hanging out with him. He wouldn't really open up to a lot about his past but you'd get little bits of it and you start to piece it together. He'd given up a lot in Poland to come here."

Interpretations and allusions
Blurring the lines between reality and non-reality, A Year in the Death of Jack Richards is an open-ended film that is vague and evasive but completely up for discussion. In interviews, Paquette has stated that it was his intention to make a film that was wide open to a variety of different interpretations. Even Vlasta Vrána, who played Jack Richards, said, "Don't ask me about the film because I don't know anything. I know what got me through making it, doing my part. [...] I had the story, I had the idea of what it is, I know what I took as my motivations—I know that the story is much more complex than what I took for myself."

Festival recognition
Between 2004 and 2007, A Year in the Death of Jack Richards was presented at numerous film festivals in countries from around the world, including the USA, the UK, Ireland, Sweden, Canada, Chile, Romania, etc., and was honoured with many prizes and accolades, including a nomination for Best First Feature Film from the prestigious International Federation of Film Critics (FIPRESCI), the Best Feature Film award from the Festival of Fantastic Films (UK), and the Grand Jury prize from the DeadCENTER Film Festival.

Theatrical release
In 2006, A Year in the Death of Jack Richards received a limited commercial release in theatres across Canada.

Critical response
Reviews were polarizing. Most critics in Toronto derided the film, while most critics outside of Toronto had nothing but high praise for the film, especially those critics in the province of Quebec. Regardless, the negative reviews were as severe as the positive.

Regarding the positive reviews, film critic Odile Tremblay concluded in Le Devoir, "A work that is radical in its style, disconcerting by its climate, courageous, open to multiple interpretations, sometimes irritating, mostly fascinating, susceptible to confounding general audiences, often too unmethodical, but worth the detour. [...] We salute a true audacity in this uneven film that gropes around in the dark but eventually reveals its brilliance in flashes, all the while refusing all compromise." Martin Gignac of Ici wrote, "To discover a mysterious and haunting pearl as this is so very rare. The glaucous music and the audacious camerawork accentuate the subtle performance by the all too unfamiliar Vlasta Vrana."

In the Montreal Gazette, John Griffin wrote, "A fascinating, challenging psychodrama [...] impressively orchestrated." In Le Soleil, Gilles Carignan wrote, "[...] the formal aspects, stunningly mastered, evoke Guy Maddin. Paquette perfectly blends amorous sentiment with terrifying suspense. A welcome surprise." In La Presse, film critic Anabelle Nicoud concluded, "A debut film that is tragic, psychological, personal, and intelligent. A must see." In Voir, Kevin Laforest wrote, "Aside from the technical brilliance, what gives the film all its power is the engaging performance by Vlasta Vrana." Malcolm Fraser of the Montreal Mirror wrote, "The film has a peculiar style, one that's hard to classify [...] There are echoes of Eraserhead and Barton Fink [...] ultimately, though, Paquette seems to be striving towards his own vision. [...] an atmospheric and intriguing little curiosity." Stephen Pedersen of The Chronicle Herald declared, "As a story it smudges the conventions of narrative. As a film it questions the conventions of film-making. [...] It's a striking achievement. [...] While what it means and how it was achieved are likely to arouse the biggest differences of opinion, on one thing, all are likely to agree: Vlasta Vrana's extraordinary performance. It is a tour-de-force [...]." The sole critic in Toronto with any praise was Adam Nayman of Eye Weekly, who opined, "B.P. Paquette is an estimable mood-setter [...] there's a pervasive sense of dread in the micro-budget, super-16mm indie A Year in the Death of Jack Richards that puts most burnished Hollywood horror-shows to shame."

Regarding the negative reviews, film critic Liz Braun's headline in the Toronto Sun summarized the opinion of most Toronto critics, "Jack Richards is Amateurish at Best." Hannah Guy of Now wrote, "Benjamin Paquette's debut feature [...] is an awkward fledgling of a movie with mediocre production values," but concluded that, "veteran thesp Vrana delivers an authentic performance." Especially dismissive were Chris Knight at the National Post, and Liam Lacey at The Globe and Mail. The former declared, "Film critics see movies [...] with pages of press notes. [...] But the press notes can, however, make all the difference. A Year in the Death of Jack Richards [...] is a labyrinth of a film and I would have been lost without the notes. As it was, I was merely disoriented. [...] The press notes refer to the film's ability to 'trouble and perplex,' which I got right away; its 'warmth and deep understanding,' which I missed and its 'electrifying' nature, which I presume is a reference to the joybuzzer shock cuts, always accompanied by the same '70s-era photo of a greasyhaired guy with a thick moustache [...] The press notes say this 'challenging film experience [...] is sure to be most appreciated by those viewers who are engaged by film as film." If that sounds like you, enjoy some popcorn as popcorn and settle back, prepared to be shocked out of your seat as a seat." The latter stated, "... often more ambitious than accomplished. ... With everything up in the air, a viewer might be forgiven for finding this chain of ambiguities more pretentious than intriguing ... The plot's Twilight Zone-like entanglements might be more palatable if the film's execution were more adept. ... the acting ranges from mediocre to amateur. The character who hires Jack ... wears possibly the worst bald wig outside a joke store. In some close-ups, Vrana's untrimmed eyebrows threaten to engulf the screen. There's one particularly static scene in a hotel room where the camera operator seems to have crouched into the corner and fallen asleep. Perhaps he or she dreamed the whole thing."

Melora Koepke of the Hour Community concluded, "While it's a good thing that there are film students to write papers about classic auteur films, it's a bit weird to watch a movie that feels more like the paper than the film. Which is how A Year in the Death of Jack Richards rings - more like an idea than an actual movie. [...] If puzzles and ambivalence are your bag, then A Year in the Death of Jack Richards is a godsend. Paquette is clearly just as concerned with muddling the edges of reality, blurring tenses in his storylines and inserting numerous homages to his cinema idols (Ingmar Bergman and Roman Polanski, probably) as he is with riveting his audience. Of course, if you have a film studies paper due, you're in luck. For others, A Year in the Death of Jack Richards is definitely a matter of taste."

Awards and nominations
 2004, Nomination for Best Canadian Feature Film at Cinéfest Sudbury International Film Festival 
 2005, Won the Best Independent Feature Award at the Festival of Fantastic Films (UK) 
 2005, Nomination for FIPRESCI Prize for Best First Feature Film at the Transylvania International Film Festival 
 2005, Won the Grand Jury Award at The DeadCENTER Film Festival
 2005, Won the Richard Kind Award for Best Actor at the Trenton Film Festival for Vlasta Vrana

References

External links

2005 films
2000s psychological drama films
Canadian psychological drama films
English-language Canadian films
Films directed by B. P. Paquette
2004 drama films
2005 drama films
2000s English-language films
2000s Canadian films